Cooper's is a bakery chain in Bangladesh. It was founded in 1984 by Douglas Cooper, a Dhaka-based British immigrant and World War II veteran, and his wife Sufia Cooper. It introduced the modern pastry shop in Bangladesh. 

What started out as just one small outlet in kolabagan and a factory now operates total 52 outlets in Dhaka and Chittagong and is a popular household name in upmarket urban areas. It has a factory on the outskirts of Dhaka in Ashulia. The company is managed by brothers John cooper and Simon Cooper, the children of Douglas and Sufia Cooper.

References 

Bakeries of Bangladesh
Bangladeshi brands
Manufacturing companies based in Dhaka
Manufacturing companies established in 1984
Food and drink companies established in 1984
1984 establishments in Bangladesh